Cat and Mouse is the sixth studio album by Singaporean duo, By2. The album was released on July 28, 2015, with a total of 9 tracks and 5 singles. The album achieved immediate success upon its release.

Background and release 
Before the album was released By2's record label, Ocean Butterflies International, uploaded the music video of the album's first single "Back in the Days" (當時的我們) on their YouTube Channel on July 12, 2015. On the date of the album's release, the MV for the song "Cat and Mouse" was released on YouTube. Music videos for three other promotional singles were also released later through the label's official channel.

Commercial performance 
By2's single (當時的我們) "Back in the Days" reached the top 3 on Taiwan's KKBox music chart on August 12, 2015. By2 won an award for most popular group at the Kugou Asian Music Awards.

Track listing

References 

2013 albums
By2 albums
Chinese-language albums